Masaya Inoue (born September 10, 1973) is a Japanese mixed martial artist. He competed in the Light heavyweight division.

Mixed martial arts record

|-
| Loss
| align=center| 3-3
| Riki Fukuda
| Decision (unanimous)
| Shooto: 1/29 in Korakuen Hall
| 
| align=center| 2
| align=center| 5:00
| Tokyo, Japan
| 
|-
| Loss
| align=center| 3-2
| Kestutis Smirnovas
| TKO (retirement)
| Shooto: 9/5 in Korakuen Hall
| 
| align=center| 1
| align=center| 5:00
| Tokyo, Japan
| 
|-
| Win
| align=center| 3-1
| Akihiko Adachi
| Decision (unanimous)
| Shooto: Gig East 9
| 
| align=center| 2
| align=center| 5:00
| Tokyo, Japan
| 
|-
| Win
| align=center| 2-1
| Kaichi Tsuji
| Decision (unanimous)
| Shooto: Treasure Hunt 3
| 
| align=center| 2
| align=center| 5:00
| Kobe, Hyogo, Japan
| 
|-
| Loss
| align=center| 1-1
| Hirotaka Yokoi
| Decision (majority)
| Shooto: R.E.A.D. 8
| 
| align=center| 2
| align=center| 5:00
| Osaka, Japan
| 
|-
| Win
| align=center| 1-0
| Jun Kitagawa
| Decision (unanimous)
| Shooto: Renaxis 5
| 
| align=center| 2
| align=center| 5:00
| Kadoma, Osaka, Japan
|

See also
List of male mixed martial artists

References

External links
 

1973 births
Japanese male mixed martial artists
Light heavyweight mixed martial artists
Living people